Ovidiu Traian Lazăr (born 3 December 1965) is a Romanian former professional footballer who played as a forward for teams such as: FC Bihor Oradea, Steaua București, Budapest Honvéd or Politehnica Timișoara, among others. He is currently a manager, last time under contract with Viitorul Borș.

References

External links
 
 

1965 births
Living people
Sportspeople from Oradea
Romanian footballers
Association football forwards
Liga I players
FC Bihor Oradea players
FC Steaua București players
FC Politehnica Timișoara players
FC Brașov (1936) players
Nemzeti Bajnokság I players
Budapest Honvéd FC players
Liga II players
FC Olimpia Satu Mare players
Romanian expatriate footballers
Romanian expatriate sportspeople in Hungary
Expatriate footballers in Hungary
Romanian football managers
FC Bihor Oradea managers
Romania international footballers